Rainer Beiter (born 18 July 1978) is a German curler.

At the national level, he is a German men's champion curler (2003; silver in 2001; bronze in 2004).

Teams

References

External links

Living people
1978 births
German male curlers
German curling champions
Place of birth missing (living people)